Hantsavichy is a city in Brest Region, Belarus. It is the administrative center of Hantsavichy District.

The Hantsavichy Radar Station is a part of the Russian early warning radar system.

Etymology 
According to Belarusian toponymist Vadzim Žučkievič name "Hantsavichy" comes from surname Hantsavich.

History
Before World War II, 60% of the population was Jewish. In the 1920s and 1930s there were four synagogues, a Jewish library, an orphanage, a Tarbut school and school in Yiddish. Under Polish administration, in 1939, the town was retaken by the Soviets and annexed to the Byelorussian Soviet Socialist Republic. The German army arrived on June 29, 1941. German occupation of Hantsavichy lasted until 7 July 1944.

From June 30 to July 1, 1941, a pogrom occurred in which 16 Jews were murdered. On August 15, 1941, 350 Jewish men were executed in the forest 11 km away from Hantsavichy. 600 Jews were shot in the town's market place. During another action 1,000 Jewish men were taken to the forest 1 km away and shot dead. A concentration work camp was established in November 1941. Besides the local Jews, there were 230 Lenin Jews and 120 native to Pogost. Small executions of 70-150 Jews took place constantly. During one of those executions, 100 Jewish refugees from Warsaw, along with two local families, Fish and Zeiger, were executed and buried in the Peski ravine. On August 14, 1942, more than 300 Jews fled the camp and others were shot. In all, during the occupation, 3,500 Jews were murdered by the Nazis in the district of Hantsavichy, including 1,500 women and 850 children.

Population 
 1897 — 633
 1909 — 1026
 1970 — 5 200
 1973 — 6 900
 1991 — 14 500
 2006 — 14 700
 2008 — 14 800
 2015 - 14 043

Education 
There are 3 schools, 1 gymnasium, agricultural lyceum and a special boarding school in Hancavičy.

References

External links
 Photos on Radzima.org

Cities in Belarus
Populated places in Brest Region
Brest Litovsk Voivodeship
Slutsky Uyezd
Polesie Voivodeship
Holocaust locations in Belarus
Hantsavichy District